Ian Russell Clark (born 23 December 1958) is a British former motorcycle speedway rider.

Speedway career
Born in Sandon, Essex, Clark's early experience came in grasstrack, in which he was British Schoolboy Champion in both 1973 and 1974. He took up speedway in 1973 at the training school at Hackney Wick, and made his competitive debut in 1975 for Peterborough Panthers. During five seasons with Panthers he was capped in the National League England team, and made several guest appearances in the British League. In 1980 he signed for British League Leicester Lions in a £2,750 transfer, reaching the semi-final of the World Championship the same year. In 1981 his performances were down on the previous year and he was sold to Hackney Hawks. In 1982 he primarily rode for Canterbury Crusaders, before spending two seasons with Oxford Cheetahs. He returned to Peterborough in 1985 before spending his final three seasons with Milton Keynes Knights.

References

1958 births
Living people
British speedway riders
English motorcycle racers
Peterborough Panthers riders
Leicester Lions riders
Hackney Hawks riders
Canterbury Crusaders riders
Oxford Cheetahs riders
Milton Keynes Knights riders
Cradley Heathens riders
Swindon Robins riders
Birmingham Brummies riders
White City Rebels riders